Route 62 may refer to:

Route 62 (MTA Maryland), a defunct bus route in Baltimore, Maryland
RATB route 62, a trolleybus route in Bucharest
London Buses route 62
Route 62 (WMATA), a bus route in Washington, D.C.

See also
List of highways numbered 62

62